The Tour International des Zibans is a stage cycling race held annually in Algeria since 2018. It is rated 2.2 and is part of UCI Africa Tour.

Winners

References

Cycle races in Algeria
2018 establishments in Algeria
Recurring sporting events established in 2018
UCI Africa Tour races